Anderson Asiedu (born 12 June 1996) is a Ghanaian footballer who plays as a midfielder for USL Championship club Birmingham Legion.

Early life
Asiedu was born in Dormaa Ahenkro, Ghana. Following his mother's death and a short stint living with his grandmother, he lived in an orphanage. At 16, he was discovered by Sylvers Owusu, a native Ghanaian who was in the country looking for players for the soccer team he coached at a high school in New Jersey. Shortly thereafter, he enrolled at St. Benedict's Prep in Newark, New Jersey on a soccer scholarship. He won a state and national championship with St. Benedict's in 2014, as well as the 2013-2014 USSDA U17/18 national championship with Players Development Academy.

College career
Asiedu started his college career at Monmouth, where he started 37 games for the Hawks in two seasons, scoring two goals and adding five assists. As a freshman, he was named to the All-Northeast Region and All-MAAC first teams, as well as the All-MAAC rookie team. As a sophomore, he was named to the All-MAAC second team.

Following his sophomore year, he transferred to UCLA to play for the Bruins. He started 34 games over two seasons, scoring three goals and adding four assists. He was named to the All-Pac-12 second team in both seasons and was named to the Pac-12 All-Academic team as a senior.

Professional career
Following a successful college career, Asiedu was drafted with the last pick of the first round of the 2019 MLS SuperDraft by defending MLS Cup champions Atlanta United. On 1 March 2019 he signed with the club ahead of the 2019 Major League Soccer season, and began the season on loan with the club's reserve team, Atlanta United 2. After making 10 appearances for Atlanta United 2, Asiedu was waived by the club on 31 May.

On 15 July 2019, Asiedu signed with USL Championship side Birmingham Legion.

References

External links
 
 

1996 births
Living people
People from Bono Region
Ghanaian footballers
Association football midfielders
Monmouth Hawks men's soccer players
UCLA Bruins men's soccer players
New York Red Bulls U-23 players
FC Golden State Force players
Atlanta United FC draft picks
Atlanta United FC players
Atlanta United 2 players
Birmingham Legion FC players
USL League Two players
USL Championship players
Ghanaian expatriate footballers
Expatriate soccer players in the United States
Ghanaian expatriate sportspeople in the United States